banjh Kanda  is a village development committee in Salyan District in Karnali Province of western-central Nepal. At the time of the 1991 Nepal census it had a population of 2241 people living in 375 individual households.

References

External links
UN map of the municipalities of Salyan District

Populated places in Salyan District, Nepal